Baby Brother is a 1927 American Our Gang short film. It marks the first appearance of long-term member Bobby "Wheezer" Hutchins.

Cast

The Gang
 Joe Cobb as Joe
 Jackie Condon as Jackie
 Jean Darling as Jean
 Allen "Farina" Hoskins as Farina
 Jannie Hoskins as Mango
 Scooter Lowry as Skooter
 Jay R. Smith as Jay
 Bobby Young as Bonedust
 Bobby "Wheezer" Hutchins as Horatio
 Mildred Kornman as Jackie's sister
 Davey Monahan as Our Gang member
 Pal the Dog as Himself
 Robert Smith as Tunney
 Richard Smith as Coolidge

Additional cast
 Symona Boniface as Party guest
 Ed Brandenburg as Officer
 Harry Earles as Gus, one of Barr's midgets
 Anita Garvin as Amorous nursemaid
 F. F. Guenste as Butler
 Ben Hall as Man with glasses
 Oliver Hardy as Nursemaid's boyfriend
 Eulalie Jensen as Joe's mother
 Lillianne Leighton as One of the mothers
 Lincoln Plumer as Joe's father
 Lyle Tayo as Party guest
 S. D. Wilcox as Officer

See also
 Our Gang filmography
 Oliver Hardy filmography

References

External links

1927 films
1927 comedy films
1927 short films
American silent short films
American black-and-white films
Films directed by Robert A. McGowan
Hal Roach Studios short films
Our Gang films
Silent American comedy films
1920s American films